Languibonou is a town in central Ivory Coast. It is a sub-prefecture of Botro Department in Gbêkê Region, Vallée du Bandama District.

Languibonou was a commune until March 2012, when it became one of 1126 communes nationwide that were abolished.

In 2014, the population of the sub-prefecture of Languibonou was 22,867.

Villages
The 32 villages of the 
sub-prefecture of Languibonou and their population in 2014 are:

Notes

Sub-prefectures of Gbêkê
Former communes of Ivory Coast